D is the debut studio album of composer Deuter, released in 1971 by Kuckuck Schallplatten.

Track listing

Personnel
Adapted from the D liner notes.
 Deuter – flute, guitar,  synthesizer, production, engineering
 Achim Elsner – mastering
 Sigrid Müller-Gunow – photography, art direction

Release history

References

External links 
 

1971 debut albums
Deuter albums
Kuckuck Schallplatten albums
Esoteric Recordings albums